Nikolay Davydenko defeated Juan Martín del Potro in the final, 6–3, 6–4 to win the singles tennis title at the 2009 ATP World Tour Finals.

Novak Djokovic was the defending champion, but was eliminated in the round-robin stage.

Andy Roddick qualified for the tournament, but withdrew due to a left leg injury.

Seeds

Alternates

Draw

Finals

Group A
Standings are determined by: 1. number of wins; 2. number of matches; 3. in two-players-ties, head-to-head records; 4. in three-players-ties, percentage of sets won, or of games won; 5. steering-committee decision.

Group B
Standings are determined by: 1. number of wins; 2. number of matches; 3. in two-players-ties, head-to-head records; 4. in three-players-ties, percentage of sets won, or of games won; 5. steering-committee decision.

See also
ATP World Tour Finals appearances

External links
Main Draw

Singles